Syed Uddin Ahmed, popularly known as Chatku Ahmed (born 6 October 1946) is a Bangladeshi film director, producer, dialogue writer and screenwriter. In 1986, he won the Bachsas Awards in 3 categories for the film Griha Bibad. He won Bangladesh National Film Awards in best dialogue writer category for Satya Mithya film in 1989.

His film Sotter Mrittu Nei is one of the highest grossing Bangladeshi films of all time.

Early life
Ahmed was born on 6 October 1946 in the village of Panhata in Munshiganj District of the then British Raj.

Filmography
 Naat Bou (1982)
 Rajdondo (1984)
 Griho Bibad (1986)
 Attyachar (1987)
 Chetona (1990)
 Maya Momota (1994)
 Sotter Mrittu Nei (1996)
 Buker Vitor Agun (1997)
 Buk Bhora Bhalobasha (1999)
 Borsha Badol (2000)
 Shesh Juddho (2002)
 Moha Tandob (2002)
 Ajker Rupban (2005)
 Protibadi Master (2005)
 Din–The Day (2022)

Director
 Sotter Mrittu Nei (1996)
 Buker Bhetor Agun (1997)
 Borsha Badol (2000)
 Shesh Juddho (2002)
 Protibadi Master (2005)

References

1946 births
Living people
Best Dialogue National Film Award (Bangladesh) winners
Bangladeshi film directors
Bangladeshi screenwriters
Bangladeshi film producers
People from Munshiganj District